Braulio Esteban Baeza Figueroa (born 1 July 1990) is a Chilean footballer.

Notes

External links
 
 

1990 births
Living people
Chilean footballers
Unión Temuco footballers
Puerto Montt footballers
O'Higgins F.C. footballers
Deportes Copiapó footballers
Chilean Primera División players
Primera B de Chile players
Association football midfielders
People from Rancagua